Riverline is a multi-building redevelopment under construction in Chicago being developed by[CMK Companies. The site was originally part of a larger project, also dubbed "Riverline" which was the effort of a partnership between Chicago-based developer CMK and Australian company Lendlease. The partnership was dissolved in early 2018, and the project was split into Riverline and Southbank.

Groundbreaking occurred in 2016 before the dissolution of the partnership. The development is north of The 78, another large-scale development.

References

Buildings and structures in Chicago
Multi-building developments in Chicago